No. 11 Squadron is a unit of the Indian Air Force assigned to South Western Air Command. The Squadron participates in operations involving air, land and airdrop of troops, equipment, supplies, and support or augment special operations forces, when appropriate.

History 
The No. 11 Squadron were raised in 1951 at Barrackpore and Jorhat and moved to the present location.

Lineage 
 Constituted as No. 11 Squadron (Charging Rhinos) on 15 November 1951

Assignments 
 Indo-Pakistani War of 1965
 Indo-Pakistani War of 1971

Aircraft 
C-47
HS-748

References 

011